"Infinite Love" is a song by A. R. Rahman.

Infinite Love may also refer to:

Infinite Love, a 2010 album by Dustin Wong
Infinite Love, a 1988 song by Meiko Nakahara

See also
Infinite Love Songs, an album by German musician Maximilian Hecker